Kangaroo Point Rovers FC is an Australian football (soccer) club from Brisbane, Queensland. The club was formed in 1996 and currently fields first and reserve grade teams in Football Brisbane's Capital League 2 competition, and competes in the Men's City League and the Brisbane Women's competitions.

History
The club was formed as Pineapple Rovers Soccer Football Club in 1996. The club is a reincarnation of the original Pineapple Rovers, one of the oldest clubs in Queensland, thought to have been formed in the late 1880s and playing out of Raymond Park (then known as the Pineapple Sportsfield, named for the adjacent Pineapple Hotel). This earlier Pineapple Rovers club won three Brisbane Division 1 premierships (in 1919, 1924 and 1925) and had an unbroken history from 1912 until November 1938 when it merged with Shafston Rovers to form Eastern Suburbs.

The current club first entered Football Brisbane competition in 2001, starting in Division 2, then the fourth tier of Brisbane's football system. The following season, the club won its first honours, defeating Clairvaux FC 2-1 in the Division 3 Grand Final.

In 2005 the club was renamed Kangaroo Point Rovers FC after relocating to its current ground and spiritual home at Raymond Park, Kangaroo Point.

The newly renamed club won the Metropolitan League Division 1 Grand Final in 2006 and promotion to Premier Division 2. Kangaroo Point Rovers remained in this division for six seasons until finishing last in 2012 and being relegated to Capital League 3.

Kangaroo Point Rovers bounced back immediately, finishing top of 2013 Capital League 3 and winning the Grand Final 2-1 over Redcliffe PCYC. The club had its best ever cup run in the 2014 Canale Cup which doubled as the 2014 FFA Cup preliminary rounds, winning through four consecutive rounds until losing to Peninsula Power in the fifth round. The club's cup form was not replicated in 2014 Capital League 2 and the club was relegated after finishing in 10th place. A further relegation in 2015 has seen Kangaroo Point Rovers FC compete in Capital League 4 since 2016.

With the rebuilding phase well underway after back to back relegations, 2017 saw the return of success both on and off the pitch at KPR with numerous improvements made within the club which culminated in a 3rd-place finish in the league, only to miss promotion and 2nd place by the way of goal difference. This didn't deter the squad as they made history winning the last ever Capital 4 Grand Final over Samford Rangers 2-0.

In January 2018, with the league restructure of Football Brisbane's footballing pyramid underway, KPR saw themselves in the newly reformed Capital 3 league. This all suddenly changed when Pine Rivers decided to withdraw from the Capital League structure meaning an availability opened up for Cap 2 football in 2018. After careful consideration, the coaching staff and committee took on the chance of returning to Cap 2  with open arms and returned to the league they once called home some 4 years ago.

2018 was to mark a significant year for the club, as we celebrated our 100th birthday 

With promotion gained, and a new coach at the helm, KPR entered its new Capital League 2 season as massive underdogs and were heavily tipped to get the dreaded drop back to Cap 3. With a string of tough results in the early stages, it was the middle part of the season which saw points come our way and movement up the league ladder with the prospect of finals football. Suspensions and injuries would play their part however, as the squad limped home to finish 8th in the standings securing Cap 2 status with a last gasp, dramatic winner against Bardon Latrobe on our 100 years of piney football celebrations.

2019 was deemed another successful year at Raymond Park, our Capital League made headlines early in the season with a FFA Cup-set beating highly regarded and fancied 4th tier Gold Coast Premier League powerhouse Broadbeach United on penalties at home. During the Capital League 2 season the First team then went on to make the finals series only to go down in the preliminary final to eventual winners and promoted Brisbane Athletic.

2020 saw us bring in a new decade with significant changes within the football club. A busy off-season saw the club strengthen ties in the community, most notably with our long term partners The Pineapple Hotel who agreed to a long term partnership with the club. A new era for women's football was herald at the club as a new partnership with local NPL club Eastern suburbs saw the two clubs come together and enter a women's Capital League squad, who will play out at Heath Park, under the name, badge and colours of KPR. Bringing not only a new competitive level of women's football to the club, but also reigniting our old ties with Easts.

New challenges, and old rivalries will resume when the new 2020 season kicks off in late February with KPR looking to push on for silverware in both Capital Leagues, as well as another successful season within the City Leagues.

Honours
Brisbane Division 3 – Champions 2002
Brisbane Metro League 1 – Champions 2006
Capital League 3 – Premiers and Champions 2013
Capital League 4 – Champions 2017

Recent seasons

Source:

The tier is the level in the Australian soccer league system

References

External links
 

Soccer clubs in Brisbane
Association football clubs established in 2005
2005 establishments in Australia
Kangaroo Point, Queensland